Sir John Thomas Gilbert, LLD, FSA, RIA (born 23 January 1829, Dublin - died 23 May 1898, Dublin) was an Irish archivist, antiquarian and historian.

Life

John Thomas Gilbert was the second son of John Gilbert, an English Protestant, who was Portuguese consul in Dublin, and Marianne Gilbert, an Irish Catholic, daughter of Henry Costello. He was born in Jervis Street, Dublin. His early days were spent at Brannockstown, County Meath. He was educated at Bective College, Dublin, and at Prior Park, near Bath, England. He received no university training, as his mother was unwilling for him to attend the Anglican Trinity College, Dublin, which was at that time the only university in Dublin. In 1846, his family moved to Blackrock, a Dublin suburb, where he resided until his death, 52 years later.

At age 19, he was elected to the Council of the Celtic Society, and thus became associated with some of the famous writers and orators of the age: Butt, Ferguson, Mitchel, and Smith O'Brien. His essay, Historical Literature of Ireland, appeared in 1851, and four years later he became a Member of the Royal Irish Academy, and secretary of the Irish Celtic and Archaeological Society, whose members included O'Donovan, O'Curry, Graves, Todd, and Wilde. In 1862, he was awarded the Royal Irish Academy's Cunningham Medal.

Taking on the most important posts in the historical and antiquarian societies, he became librarian of the Royal Irish Academy for thirty-four years. In 1891 he married the Irish novelist Rosa Mulholland. He received the honorary degree of LL.D. from the Royal University in 1892, and five years later was knighted for his services to archaeology and history.

The Gilbert Library, in Dublin's Pearse Street, is named after him.

Works
History of the City of Dublin (1854-9), in three volumes. 
History and Treatment of the Public Records of Ireland (1863) which caused considerable sensation, arguing to the government the futility of entrusting the publication of Irish State documents to men unskilled in the Irish language. 
History of the Viceroys of Ireland (1865) 
Calendar of the Ancient Records of Dublin (7 vols., 1889–98)
History of the Irish Confederation and the War in Ireland, 1641-9 (7 vols., 1882–91)
Jacobite Narrative of the War in Ireland, 1688-91 (1892).

Other

Celtic scholars are indebted to him for photographic reproductions of ancient Irish manuscripts, for the establishment of the Todd lectureship in Celtic, and also for editions of Leabhar na h-Uidhre and Leabhar Breac.

References

Citations

Sources

External links 

Books by John Thomas Gilbert Online, University of Pennsylvania Library
A contemporary History of Affairs in Ireland, Vol. I, Part I.
A contemporary History of Affairs in Ireland, Vol. I, Part II.
A contemporary History of Affairs in Ireland, Vol. II.
A contemporary History of Affairs in Ireland, Vol. III.
 A Passion for Books : The Gilbert Library

1829 births
1898 deaths
19th-century Irish historians
Irish antiquarians
Members of the Royal Irish Academy
Writers from Dublin (city)
Knights Bachelor